The list of shipwrecks in July 1830 includes ships sunk, foundered, grounded, or otherwise lost during July 1830.

2 July

3 July

4 July

5 July

8 July

9 July

10 July

11 July

13 July

14 July

18 July

19 July

21 July

23 July

24 July

25 July

29 July

30 July

Unknown date

References

1830-07